Volleyball events were contested at the 1999 Summer Universiade in Palma de Mallorca, Spain.

References

External links
 Universiade volleyball medalists on HickokSports

U
1999 Summer Universiade
Volleyball at the Summer Universiade